Oliver Klaus (born 4 May 1990) is a Swiss footballer who plays for FC Balzers.

References

Swiss men's footballers
Swiss Super League players
1990 births
Living people
FC Vaduz players
Swiss expatriate footballers
Swiss expatriate sportspeople in Liechtenstein
Expatriate footballers in Liechtenstein
Association football goalkeepers